José Jesús Márquez Sánchez is a Spanish Taekwondo athlete.

He is a two-time world champion (1995 and 1997) and five-time straight national welterweight champion (from 1994 to 1998). At the 1995 World Championships in Manila, Márquez won the welterweight (−76 kg) gold medal by defeating Jean Lopez, the eldest Lopez sibling, in the final.

References 

Spanish male taekwondo practitioners
Living people
Year of birth missing (living people)
European Taekwondo Championships medalists
World Taekwondo Championships medalists
20th-century Spanish people